Elytrigia is a genus of about 20–40 species of grasses, native to temperate regions of the Old World, in Europe, Asia, and northwest Africa. The species are sometimes included in the related genera Agropyron or Elymus, while species in the genera Pascopyrum and Pseudoroegneria are included in Elytrigia by some authors. The genus name has also been spelled Elytrigium.

Selected species:

Elytrigia alatavica
Elytrigia atherica
Elytrigia bessarabica
Elytrigia caespitosa
Elytrigia campestris
Elytrigia curvifolia
Elytrigia disticha
Elytrigia elongata
Elytrigia gmelinii
Elytrigia intermedia
Elytrigia juncea
Elytrigia lolioides
Elytrigia pontica
Elytrigia pungens
Elytrigia pycnantha
Elytrigia rechingeri
Elytrigia repens
Elytrigia scirpea
Elytrigia trichophora
Elytrigia varnensis

References

Pooideae
Poaceae genera